Nils-Ole Book (born 17 February 1986) is a German former professional footballer who played as a midfielder.

He was a youth international for Germany at under-16 and under-21 levels.

References

External links
 
 

1986 births
Living people
Association football midfielders
German footballers
Germany under-21 international footballers
Germany youth international footballers
Rot Weiss Ahlen players
MSV Duisburg players
SV Wehen Wiesbaden players
2. Bundesliga players
3. Liga players